Wonderlustre is the fourth studio album by the British rock band Skunk Anansie. It was the band's first full studio album since Post Orgasmic Chill in 1999. It was released on 13 September 2010 in Europe on V2 Records, earMUSIC and Carosello Records and was preceded by the single "My Ugly Boy", which was released on 16 August 2010. The album is available digitally, as a single CD, a 2 CD tour edition set, a CD/DVD digipack and as a 12" double LP.

In 2012 it was awarded a silver certification from the Independent Music Companies Association, which indicated sales of at least 20,000 copies throughout Europe.

Track listing
All tracks written by Skunk Anansie; except where indicated

DVD

Personnel
Skunk Anansie
Skin - vocals, backing vocals; guitar on "God Loves Only You"; piano on "My Love Will Fall" and "I Will Stay But You Should Leave"
Martin "Ace" Kent - guitar
Richard "Cass" Lewis - bass guitar
Mark Richardson - drums, percussion
with:
Toby Baker - Hammond organ on "God Loves Only You", "Over the Love" and "I Will Stay But You Should Leave"
James McMillan - piano on "You Saved Me"
Brio Taliaferro - programming; keyboards on "You Saved Me"
Neil Comber - additional programming
Brio Taliaferro, Oliver Kraus and Skin - string arrangement on "Talk Too Much"
Oliver Kraus - strings on "Talk Too Much"
Technical
Chris Sheldon - engineer
Cenzo Townshend, Jeremy Wheatley - mixing
Shotopop - cover illustration, art direction
Jeon Seung Hwan - photography

Charts

Certifications

References

2010 albums
Skunk Anansie albums
V2 Records albums
Carosello Records albums